Ann-Christine is a feminine given name.

People with the given name 
 Ann-Christine Albertsson (born 1945), Swedish chemist
 Ann-Christine Bärnsten (born 1957), Swedish singer and writer
 Ann-Christine Hagberg (born 1948), Swedish swimmer
 Ann-Christine Nyström (born 1944), Finnish singer
 Ann-Christine From Utterstedt (born 1972), Swedish politician

See also 
 
 

Compound given names
Finnish feminine given names
Swedish feminine given names